
The Cassanawald tunnel is a  long tunnel on the A13 road in Switzerland, at an altitude of 1600 m.

It is a few km northeast of the San Bernardino tunnel and southwest of the Roflatunnel.

Unusually, a railway was laid through the road tunnel in order to ease access for maintenance and fireproofing work.

References

Road tunnels in Switzerland
Tunnels in Graubünden
Tunnels completed in 1967